The Belly River Group is a stratigraphical unit of Late Cretaceous age in the Western Canadian Sedimentary Basin. 

It takes the name from the Belly River, a tributary of the Oldman River in southern Alberta, and was first described in outcrop on the banks of the Oldman River (at the time considered part of the Belly River) and Bow River by George Mercer Dawson in 1883.

Lithology
The Belly River Group is composed of very fine grained sandstone with coarse grained beds and minor bentonite, coal, green shale, and concretionary beds.

Hydrocarbon production
Gas is produced from the Belly River Group in the Deep Basin, in west-central Alberta and in the Canadian Rockies foothills.

Paleofauna
Dinosaur remains are among the fossils that have been recovered from the formation.

Distribution
It is found throughout southern Alberta, and as far east as eastern Saskatchewan. From south to north, it is present from the United States border to the Wapiti River region, south of the Peace River Country.

Relationship to other units
The Belly River Group is conformably overlain by the Bearpaw Formation and gradually overlies the Wapiabi Formation, the Colorado Group shale or the Lea Park Formation shale.

It is equivalent to the Milk River Formation and Pakowki Formation. The Belly River has group status in the Canadian Rockies foothills and is replaced by the Oldman Formation (Judith River Formation in Montana) and Foremost Formation in southern Alberta.

See also
 List of dinosaur-bearing rock formations

References

Stratigraphy of Alberta
Upper Cretaceous Series of North America